50 and Not Pregnant is the fourth album and eleventh Bravo stand-up comedy special by stand-up comedian Kathy Griffin and thirteenth overall.

Track listing

Personnel

Technical and production
Andy Cohen - executive producer
Kathy Griffin - executive producer
Jenn Levy - executive producer
Paul Miller - executive producer
Kimber Rickabaugh - executive producer
Jeff U'ren - film editor
Bruce Ryan - production designer
Cisco Henson - executive in charge of production
Lesley Maynard - production supervisor
Gene Crowe - associate director, stage manager
Dave Bell - production assistant
Joe Cacciatore - production assistant
James Lovewell - production assistant
Bridget Morris - production assistant
Mike White - production assistant

Visuals and imagery
Ashlee Mullen - hair stylist / make-up artist
Simon Miles - lighting designer

Award and nominations
The live Bravo performance special was nominated for the Grammy for Best Comedy Album in the 54th Grammy Awards.

References

External links
Kathy Griffin's Official Website

Kathy Griffin albums
Stand-up comedy albums
2011 live albums
Live comedy albums
2010s comedy albums
2010s spoken word albums
Spoken word albums by American artists
Live spoken word albums